Khurshid Anwar may refer to:

 Khwaja Khurshid Anwar (1912–1984), filmmaker, writer, director and music composer
 Khurshid Anwar (Major), activist of All-India Muslim League